Westkerke may refer to:

Westkerke, Netherlands
Westkerke, Belgium in the municipality of Oudenburg

See also
Helensburgh Parish Church, church in Helensburgh, Scotland, formerly called the West Kirk.